Valley Children's Stadium, also known as Jim Sweeney Field at Bulldog Stadium, is an outdoor college football stadium in the western United States, located on the campus of California State University, Fresno in Fresno, California. It is the home field of the Fresno State Bulldogs, who play in the Mountain West Conference.

History

Funding and construction 
At that time, there were only two stadiums in the Fresno area, Ratcliffe and McLane, which made scheduling of local football games difficult. Those two stadiums had to host all local high school, community college and University games, which forced some high school games to be played on Thursday nights, rather than the traditional Friday nights.

The addition of Lamonica Stadium in Clovis eased the bottleneck somewhat, but efforts to build a stadium at Fresno State became serious in the mid-1970s. Bob Goss, chairman of the athletics booster organization the Bulldog Foundation, said in 1973: "I feel strongly the community of Fresno not only needs a new stadium, but can afford it, and is willing to get going as soon as possible on a drive to raise a part of the money." 

In 1975, Fresno State students voted not to contribute to the stadium project via tuition fees, but the state budget included $1.2 million for it. A stadium steering committee was established in 1977, led by local businessman Leon Peters, looking to make the project a reality.

An initial round of construction bids came in over-budget and the steering committee re-worked their request. A second round of bidding offered better results and the local Robert F. Fisher Company was awarded the construction contract. Bulldog Stadium was completed in September 1980, a few months ahead of schedule, and had a seating capacity of 30,000. 

It hosted the California Bowl from 1981 to 1991 and friendly soccer matches prior to the 1994 FIFA World Cup.

Renovations 
The completion of the stadium correlated with a drastic rise in the fortunes of the Fresno State football program, led by head coach Jim Sweeney, including multiple conference championships and finishing the 1985 season ranked 16th in the coaches' poll. But the program still had problems scheduling high-profile opponents, and a stadium expansion was proposed as a way to mitigate those issues, as well as boost recruiting efforts and revenue. The expansion was approved in 1989 and completed in 1991. The expansion consisted of 22 "sky suites" added to the east side, as well as 2,000 more chair seats and 7,200 bench seats, increasing capacity from 30,000 to around 40,000.

In 2019, renovations occurred which included:
 Renovation of the seating area
 Cross aisle with tunnels in the northeast, northwest, southeast, and southwest sections to improve access to the seating areas
 Increased number of concessions point of sale
 Improved restroom facilities
 Addition of a tower and upgraded suites, plus additional seating
 A new football operations building in the south end zone to include offices, meeting rooms, a home-team locker room, and outdoor lounge area

Impact 
Bulldog Stadium enjoys a reputation of having one of the premier home football environments among universities outside of the so-called "power conferences". Tailgate parties in the adjoining parking lots and athletic fields are an enormously popular pastime for Bulldog supporters and the fans are notable for their enthusiastic support within the stadium's environment. For several decades, supporters of Fresno State football have been nicknamed "The Red Wave" as a tribute to their swell of support and their tendency to be clad entirely in red clothing for home contests.

For most of Fresno State's history, Bulldog Stadium is at its loudest when Fresno State plays their traditional arch-rival, the San Jose State Spartans. However, in recent years, Fresno State's most bitterly contested games have been pitted against the Boise State Broncos, whose success in the Western Athletic Conference, and then in the Mountain West Conference when both teams joined, has contributed to a fierce and energetic modern rivalry.

Facility 

Bulldog Stadium is constructed in a modern version of the sunken "bowl" style, with seats situated unusually close to the game action and at a steeper slope compared to bowled stadia of the early 20th century. This intimate atmosphere contributes to a louder, more intense gametime experience. Field lighting is mounted on four unique, recognizable cantilevered standards.

Currently Bulldog Stadium ranks 110th on the List of American football stadiums by capacity.

Field markings 

For Fresno State football games, both end zones are designed in a red-and-white checkerboard pattern, similar to the University of Tennessee's orange-and-white at Neyland Stadium. In 2019, athletic director Terry Tumey said; "I think many folks see that checkerboard and it resonates Fresno State." Fresno State's Bulldog mascot is depicted at midfield in an enlarged style. A green and red "V" appears at the 25-yard line as a tribute to the agricultural community of the San Joaquin Valley. The "V" matches the design worn on the back of the players helmets.

The field was notable for having numerical markers every five yards (similar to the field at Louisiana State's Tiger Stadium) rather than every ten yards, as is typical. The field went back to the conventional ten-yard markings in 2009.

Playing surface 
For its first 31 seasons, the playing field was natural grass; infilled FieldTurf was installed  in the summer of 2011. Concerns arose when winter rains saturated the field in the season prior, making for very slick field conditions. The $1.2 million project was funded entirely through private donations. The artificial turf was replaced in 2019 when it reached the end of its life span.

Naming 
The field was named for longtime head coach Jim Sweeney  in a 1997 ceremony.

Local children's hospital Valley Children's Healthcare agreed to provide the Fresno State athletics department with $1 million annually over 10 years in exchange for the naming rights of Bulldog Stadium. The consulting agency formed by alumni brothers Derek and David Carr played a pivotal role in the negotiations of the deal. Referring to the deal, Derek Carr said both organizations are "leaders in the Valley" and that "this partnership just made so much sense to us." The stadium renaming became official in July 2022 via a vote by the CSU Board of Trustees and it faced a backlash on social media, with some area residents saying Valley Children's is "squandering funds" and others lamenting the addition of more advertising to the in-person stadium experience.

See also
 List of NCAA Division I FBS football stadiums

References

Further reading

External links
 Fresno State Athletics: Bulldog Stadium
 World Stadiums.com - Bulldog Stadium - photos

1980 establishments in California
American football venues in California
College football venues
Fresno State Bulldogs football
Sports venues completed in 1980
Sports venues in Fresno, California
Venues of defunct NCAA bowl games